Peter Vindahl Jensen (born 16 February 1998) is a Danish professional footballer who plays as a goalkeeper for 2. Bundesliga club 1. FC Nürnberg, on loan from AZ Alkmaar.

Club career

FC Nordsjælland
Vindahl Jensen started his career at Hørup Ungdoms- og Idrætsforening (HUI), and later joined Lyngby Boldklub before he, at the age of 17, joined the Nordsjælland academy in January 2015. Already some months after his arrival, he began training with the first team. He was included in the first-team squad 11 times in his first season at the club, without making any appearances. Vindahl Jensen became a permanent part of the first team squad in January 2016.

Vindahl Jensen did not make any appearances in the following two seasons either, despite being in the squad 19 league games in total, until the 2018–19 season, where he made his official debut. This occurred on 26 September 2018 in a Danish Cup match against HB Køge, where he kept a clean sheet in a 4–0 win. In the first league game of newly appointed manager Flemming Pedersen on 30 March 2019, Vindahl Jensen made his Danish Superliga debut against FC Midtjylland, which ended 0–0.

On 10 January 2019, Vindahl Jensen signed a new contract extension keeping him in Nordsjælland until 2022.

AZ Alkmaar 
On 16 August 2021, Vindahl Jensen signed a four-year contract with Eredivisie club AZ Alkmaar. In his first season at the club, Vindahl Jensen was first keeper, making a total of 48 appearances. But in his second season, he had to act as reserve for Hobie Verhulst. 

In search of more playing time, German 2. Bundesliga club 1. FC Nürnberg could confirm on 11 December 2022 that Vindahl Jensen from January 2023 until the end of the season, would play for the club on a loan-deal.

International career
In May 2018, Vindahl Jensen trained with the Denmark national team because they needed more goalkeepers for the training sessions. He was called up to the senior Denmark squad for the 2022 FIFA World Cup qualification matches against the Faroe Islands and Scotland on 12 and 15 November 2021, respectively.

References

External links
 
 

1998 births
Living people
People from Helsingør
Danish men's footballers
Danish expatriate men's footballers
Sportspeople from the Capital Region of Denmark
Association football goalkeepers
Denmark under-21 international footballers
Denmark youth international footballers
Danish Superliga players
Eredivisie players
2. Bundesliga players
Lyngby Boldklub players
FC Nordsjælland players
AZ Alkmaar players
1. FC Nürnberg players
Danish expatriate sportspeople in the Netherlands
Danish expatriate sportspeople in Germany
Expatriate footballers in the Netherlands
Expatriate footballers in Germany